Loletha Elayne Falana or Loletha Elaine Falana (born September 11, 1942), better known by her stage name Lola Falana, is an American singer, dancer, and actress.

Early life 
Lola Falana was born in Camden, New Jersey. She was the third of six children born to Bennett, a welder and Cleo Falana, a seamstress (1921–2010). Falana's father, an Afro-Cuban, left his homeland of Cuba to serve in the U.S. Marine Corps, later becoming a welder shortly after meeting Falana's mother, who was African-American. By the age of three, Falana was dancing, and by age five she was singing in the church choir. In 1952, Falana's family, which by this time included two more siblings, moved to Philadelphia, Pennsylvania. In the period she was in junior high school, Falana was already dancing in nightclubs to which she was escorted by her mother. Pursuing a musical career became so important to her that, against her parents' wishes, she dropped out of Germantown High School a few months before graduation and moved to New York City.

Career 
In 1958, Falana's first dancing gig was at age sixteen during a Dinah Washington nightclub appearance in Philadelphia in which Washington gave her the opening act slot to perform. Washington, dubbed the "Queen of Blues", was influential in fostering Falana's early career. While dancing in a chorus line in Atlantic City, New Jersey, Falana was discovered by Sammy Davis Jr., who gave her a featured role in his 1964 Broadway musical Golden Boy. After the musical, Falana launched her music career later in 1964. Her first single, "My Baby", was recorded and released for Mercury Records in 1965. Later in her career, she recorded under Frank Sinatra's record label. In the late 1960s, Falana was mentored by Sammy Davis, Jr.

In 1966, Davis cast Falana, along with himself, Ossie Davis, and Cicely Tyson, in her first film role, in A Man Called Adam. Falana became a major star of Italian television, from 1966, and cinema, beginning in 1967. In Italy she learned to speak fluent Italian while starring in three movies, the first of which was considered a Spaghetti Western. She was a showgirl for Saturday night main TV show Sabato sera, next to acclaimed singer Mina. She was known as the "Black Venus". During this time she was busy touring with Davis as a singer and dancer, making films in Italy, and reprising her role in Golden Boy during its revival in London. In 1969, Falana ended her close working relationship with Sammy Davis Jr., though the two remained friends. "If I didn't break away," She told TV Guide, "I would always be known as the little dancer with Sammy Davis Jr. ... I wanted to be known as something more." In 1970, she made her American film debut in The Liberation of L.B. Jones and was nominated for the Golden Globe Award for New Star Of The Year – Actress for her performance. That same year she posed for Playboy magazine. She was the first black woman to model for the Fabergé "Tigress" perfume ads. In those early years, she also starred in a few movies considered to be of the blaxploitation genre. She appeared at the Val Air Ballroom sponsored by Black Pride, Inc., in 1978.

American TV audiences became familiar with Falana during the early 1970s. She often appeared on The Joey Bishop Show and The Hollywood Palace, displaying her talent for music, dance, and light comedy. These appearances led to more opportunities. She was the first supporting player hired by Bill Cosby for his much-anticipated variety hour, The New Bill Cosby Show, which made its debut on September 11, 1972 (her 30th birthday) on CBS. Cosby had met Falana in his college days, when he was a struggling comic and she was a 14-year-old dancing for $10 a show in Philadelphia nightclubs. Throughout the mid-1970s, Falana made guest appearances on many popular TV shows, including The Tonight Show Starring Johnny Carson, The Muppet Show, Laugh-In and The Flip Wilson Show. She also starred in her own television specials. In 1975, Falana's disco record There's A Man Out There Somewhere reached #67 on the Billboard R&B chart. That same year, she returned to Broadway as the lead in the musical Doctor Jazz. Although the production closed after just five performances, Falana was nominated for a Tony Award and won the 1975 Theater World Award.

With help from Sammy Davis, Jr., she brought her act to Las Vegas and became a top draw there. By the late 1970s, Falana was considered the "Queen of Las Vegas". She played to sold-out crowds at The Sands, The Riviera, and the MGM Grand hotels. Finally The Aladdin offered her $100,000 a week to perform. At the time, Falana was the highest paid female performer in Las Vegas. Her show ran twenty weeks a year and became a major tourist attraction. While still playing to sold-out crowds in Las Vegas, Falana looked to other key TV roles, originally being slated to star in a remake of the 50s Vampira Show. When this project collapsed she joined the cast of a short-lived CBS soap opera, Capitol, as Charity Blake, a wealthy entertainment mogul.

Later career and life 
In 1995, Falana recorded the song "Don't Cry, Mary" with Catholic artist Joseph Lee Hooker. No longer performing, she now tours the country with a message of hope and spirituality. When not on tour, she lives a quiet life in Las Vegas working on the apostolate she founded, The Lambs of God Ministry. The ministry is focused on helping children who have been orphaned in Sub-Saharan Africa, and works closely with the group Save Sub-Saharan Orphans. Falana's last known musical performance was in 1997, at Wayne Newton's theater in Branson, Missouri.

Personal life

Love affair and marriage 
Sometime during 1965–1968, Lola Falana had an affair with her then-mentor Sammy Davis Jr., that became public knowledge after Davis confessed it to his then-wife May Britt, which led to their divorce in 1968. Falana was married to Feliciano "Butch" Tavares Jr., one of five brothers of the popular R&B and Soul vocal band Tavares in 1970, later divorcing in 1975.

Health problems 
In 1987, Falana had a severe relapse of multiple sclerosis. Falana's left side was paralyzed, she became partially blind, and her voice and hearing were impaired. Her recovery lasted a year and a half, during which she spent most of her time praying. Falana attributes her recovery to a spiritual experience which she described as "Being able to feel the presence of the Lord". Falana converted to Roman Catholicism in 1988 and worked her newly found spirituality into her daily life. Though she performed again in Las Vegas shows in 1987, Falana's practice of religion and faith became the center of her life. After another bout with multiple sclerosis in 1996, Falana returned to Philadelphia and lived with her parents for a short time.

Cultural references 
 Rapper Foxy Brown rapped, "Lola Falana dripped in Gabbana, 90's style, the finest style..." in her song "I'll Be Good", with Jay Z on her debut album Ill Na Na.
 In D.C. Cab, Tyrone (played by Charlie Barnett) asks the character Denise "When you goin' out with me?" Her incredulous response of "Why should I go out with you?" is met by a defiant "Because I'm black and I'm beautiful." Denise deadpans, "Well, so is Lola Falana, but you don't see me goin' out with her."
 In A Different World, Whitley Gilbert makes numerous references to Lola Falana throughout the series.
 In Wayans Bros. Marlon and Shawn attempt to pick up an elderly man in their "afrocab" and tell him that they have a old magazine with Lola Falana (you remember her from all those hilarious Bob Hope specials Marlon proclaims) as the centerpiece. They force the man into the cab after he declines and runs off, where Shawn and Marlon realize the magazine is gone. Shawn then says "those white guys sure love them some Lola Falana." 
 The SCTV character Lola Heatherton, played by Catherine O'Hara, was derived from the names of Lola Falana and Joey Heatherton. The character spoofed both women, especially in their later career television variety show appearances in the 1970s.
In Roxanne Shante's song "Have a Nice Day", she declares herself "A pioneer / like Lola Falana".
 In Barbershop 2: Back in Business, barber Eddie (Cedric the Entertainer) admonishes his boss Calvin (Ice Cube) for making him take down his picture of Lola Falana from the wall of his booth.
 In Family Matters, Eddie (Darius McCrary) wants new high-tops that cost $70, but Carl (Reginald VelJohnson) "would not pay $70 for shoes if Lola Falana was in them."
 In Marvel Comics's Tomb of Dracula #58 (published in July 1977), the vampire hunter Blade says "That's why I was watchin' that clock like it was a Penthouse pin-up of Lola Falana!"
 In the Sanford and Son episode "The Escorts" (season 5, episode 19) Fred (Redd Foxx) is hired by Lola Falana and returns from her home exhausted and disheveled with her dog on a chain.
 Rapper Esham recorded a song called "Lowlafalana" in 1997.
 A recurring sketch on In Living Color, "Miss Black Person USA," takes place at the fictional Lola Falana Recreational Center in Detroit.
 In an early episode of Family Guy, Peter Griffin flashes back to a time when he confused his girlfriend, Leslie Uggams, with Lola Falana.
 In an August 2019 interview with Vulture, actress Niecy Nash named Falana as her earliest inspiration: "I knew I wanted to be an actor when I was 5 years old and I saw the most gorgeous black woman on television. I said to my grandmother, 'Who is that?,' and she said, 'Baby, that's Lola Falana.' And I said, 'That's what I want to be, Grandma. I want to be black and fabulous and on TV.'"
 In 2022, R&B singer Muni Long referenced her with her performance at the BET Awards.

Filmography 
A Man Called Adam (1966)
I'll Try Tonight  Stasera mi butto (1967)
Lola Colt (1967)
When I Say That I Love You (1967)
The Liberation of L.B. Jones (1970)
The Klansman (1974)
Lady Cocoa (1975)
Mad About You (1990)
Mary's Land (2013)

Television work 
Sabato sera (1967) – Italy
 The Flip Wilson Show, Season 1, Episode 8 (1970)
Teatro Dieci (1971) – Italy
The New Bill Cosby Show (1972–1973)
Hai visto mai? (1973) – Italy
The Streets of San Francisco, episode "A String of Puppets" (February 7, 1974)
Ben Vereen... Comin' at Ya (1975) (canceled after 4 episodes)
Lola (1975)
The Lola Falana Show, four variety specials on ABC (January – March 1976)
The Love Boat, Season 2, Episodes 1 and 2 (1978)
Liberace: Valentine's Day Special (1979)
The Muppet Show, Season 4, Episode 11 (1979)
 Fantasy Island, "Spending Spree", Season 2, Episode 19 (1979)
Lola, Lola y Lollo (1982)
Made in Italy (1982) – Italy
Capitol (1984–1986)

References

External links 

 
 
 "Bobbie Wygant Interviews Lola Falana"
 

1942 births
Living people
African-American Catholics
African-American female dancers
American female dancers
American dancers
African-American dancers
African-American female models
American female models
African-American models
American entertainers of Cuban descent
Fiorello H. LaGuardia High School alumni
Musicians from Camden, New Jersey
Musicians from Philadelphia
People with multiple sclerosis
African-American actresses
American television actresses
American film actresses
American musical theatre actresses
20th-century African-American women singers
Hispanic and Latino American actresses
Actors from Camden, New Jersey
Catholics from New Jersey
Dancers from New York (state)
Las Vegas shows
American expatriates in Italy
Converts to Roman Catholicism
21st-century African-American people
21st-century African-American women
United Service Organizations entertainers